The women's tournament in wheelchair basketball at the 2012 Summer Paralympics was held from 30 August to 7 September. Competitions were held at the newly built Basketball Arena, which seated 10,000 spectators, and North Greenwich Arena (The O2 Arena renamed during the Games because of a no-commercialisation policy on arena names).

33 matches were played, 20 in the preliminary round, and 13 in the classification and medal rounds.

Germany beat Australia in the final, while the Netherlands beat defending champions United States in the match for the bronze medal.

Calendar

Group stage

Group A

Group B

Second round

9th/10th place match

Quarter-finals

Classification round

5th–8th place semi-finals

7th/8th place match

5th/6th place match

Medal round

Semi-finals

Bronze medal match

Gold medal match

Ranking

See also
 Wheelchair basketball at the 2012 Summer Paralympics – Men

References

Sources
 
 

Women
Para